Wang Di (born 6 April 1981) is a Chinese football referee. He has been a full international referee for FIFA from 2011 to 2017.

References 

Chinese football referees
Living people
1981 births
Sportspeople from Shanghai
Fudan University alumni